is a theophoric name that is used as a surname or as a male given name. Gottlieb appeared in High German in the 17th century, in German speaking parts of Europe. It was a product of the age of pietism, giving young men a religiously charged name.

Equivalent names in other languages include Latin , Greek , and Bulgarian .

Surname

 Adolph Gottlieb, American sculptor and painter
 Alan Gottlieb, American author and conservative activist
 Anna Gottlieb, Austrian soprano
 Anthony Gottlieb, British writer
Bernice Gottlieb (born 1931), early leader in the trans-racial adoption movement
 Binyamin Gottlieb, American criminal
 Carl Gottlieb, American screenwriter
 Chaim Yosef Gottlieb of Stropkov, Hungarian rabbi
 Craig Gottlieb, American militaria and antique dealer
 Danny Gottlieb, American drummer
 David Gottlieb (disambiguation), several people
 Doug Gottlieb, American basketball player
 Dovid Gottlieb, Israeli mathematician
 Edward Gottlieb, Ukrainian basketball coach
 Eli Gottlieb, Israeli philosopher
 Ferdinand Gottlieb (1919–2007), American architect
 Franz Josef Gottlieb (1930–2006), Austrian film director and screenwriter
 Gilbert Gottlieb (1929–2006), American psychologist
 Harry Gottlieb (1895–1992), American painter, screen printer, lithographer, and educator
 Jean Raymond Gottlieb, Monégasque bodyguard
 Jette Gottlieb (born 1948), Danish politician
 Joseph Abraham Gottlieb (1918–2007), birthname of Joey Bishop, American entertainer
 Kade Gottlieb, also known as Gottmik, American drag performer and makeup artist
 Katherine Gottlieb, American businessperson
 Larry Gottlieb (born 1951), American songwriter
Lauren Gottlieb. American dancer
 Laurie N. Gottlieb, professor
 Lea Gottlieb, Hungarian-born Israeli fashion designer
 Leo Gottlieb (1920–1972), New York Knicks basketball player
 Leo Gottlieb (lawyer) (c. 1896–1989), one of the founding partners of the firm Cleary Gottlieb Steen & Hamilton
 Leopold Gottlieb, Polish painter, brother of Maurycy
 Leslie D. Gottlieb (1936–2012), American biologist
 Lindsay Gottlieb, American basketball coach
 Lori Gottlieb, American journalist
 Louis Gottlieb, American entertainer, bassist of the Limelighters
 Lynn Gottlieb (born 1949), American rabbi
 Marcel Gottlieb, French comic creator known professionally as Gotlib
 Mark Gottlieb (disambiguation)
 Maurycy Gottlieb, Polish painter, brother of Leopold
 Max Gottlieb (born 1969), American production designer, screenwriter, and film director
 Michael S. Gottlieb, American AIDS researcher
 Michael T. Gottlieb, American bridge player
 Mike Gottlieb, American college baseball coach
Nina Katzir  née Gottlieb (1914 - 1986), wife of the President of the State of Israel Ephraim Katzir
 Otto Gottlieb (1920–2011), Czechoslovak-born naturalized Brazilian chemist and scientist
 Paul David Gottlieb (1943–2003), American molecular biologist
 Robert Gottlieb, American writer
 Scott Gottlieb, American physician and commissioner of the US Food and Drug Administration
 Sidney Gottlieb (1918 - 1999), American chemist and spymaster
 Sigal Gottlieb, American applied mathematician
 William P. Gottlieb, American photographer
 The two founders of the Adolph and Esther Gottlieb Foundation

Given name (first name and middle name)

 Gottlieb Amstein, Swiss cyclist
 Gottlieb Ast, Estonian politician
 Gottlieb Berger, American politician
 Gottlieb Bodmer, German artist
 Gottlieb Nathaniel Bonwetsch, German theologian
 Gottlieb Burckhardt, Swiss psychiatrist
 Gottlieb Burian, founder of Burien, Washington, United States
 Gottlieb Bender Christiansen, American priest
 Gottlieb Daimler, German industrialist
 Gottlieb Adelbert Delbrück, German banker
 Gottlieb Duttweiler, Swiss businessman
 Gottlieb Elster, German sculptor
 Gottlieb Fröhlich, Swiss rower
 Gottlieb Garber, American politician
 Gottlieb Gluge, German physician who practised in Belgium
 Gottlieb Göller, German footballer and manager
 Gottlieb Göttlich, German intersex man
 Gottlieb Graupner, American composer
 Gottlieb Sigmund Gruner, cartographer and geologist
 Gottlieb Haberlandt, Austrian botanist
 Gottlieb Graf von Haeseler, German general
 Gottlieb Christoph Harless, German classicist
 Gottlieb Christoph Adolf von Harless, German theologian
 Gottlieb Heileman, American brewer
 Gottlieb Hering, German SS-Hauptsturmführer (captain), concentration camp commandant
 Gottlieb August Wilhelm Herrich-Schäffer, German entomologist and physician
 Gottlieb Hufeland, German economist
 Gottlieb Jäger, Swiss politician and judge
 Gottlieb von Jagow, German diplomat
 Gottlieb Kirchhoff, Russian chemist
 Gottlieb Jakob Kuhn, Swiss poet
 Gottlieb Wilhelm Leitner, British orientalist
 Gottlieb Machate, German chess player
 Gottlieb Madl, German film editor
 Gottlieb Matthias Carl Masch, German historian
 Gottlieb Mittelberger, German writer and educator
 Gottlieb Mohnike, German translator, theologian, and philologist
 Gottlieb Muffat, American composer and organist
 Gottlieb Nakuta, Namibian footballer
 Gottlieb Ott, Swiss businessman
 Gottlieb Konrad Pfeffel, German writer
 Gottlieb Jakob Planck, German historian
 Gottlieb Polak, Austrian equestrian
 Gottlieb Rabener, German writer
 Gottlieb Reber, Swiss art dealer and collector
 Gottlieb Redecker, German architect
 Gottlieb Renz, a winner of the Knight's Cross of the Iron Cross
 Gottlieb Ringier, Swiss politician
 Gottlieb Eliel Saarinen, Finnish-American architect
 Gottlieb Schick, German artist
 Gottlieb Schuler, Australian journalist
 Gottlieb Schumacher, American archaeologist and architect
 Gottlieb Stephanie, Austrian opera librettist
 Gottlieb Conrad Christian Storr, German naturalist
 Gottlieb Storz, American businessman
 Gottlieb Samuel Studer, Swiss mountain climber
 Gottlob Heinrich Curt von Tottleben, German-born Russian general
 Gottlieb Viehe, German missionary
 Gottlieb Charles Wachter, German businessman
 Gottlieb Wanzenried, cyclist
 Gottlieb Weber, cyclist
 Gottlieb Wehrle, American politician
 Gottlieb Welté, German painter
 Gottlieb Ziegler, Swiss politician
 Alexander Gottlieb Baumgarten, German philosopher
 Fabian Gottlieb von Bellingshausen, Russian admiral and explorer
 Michael Gottlieb Bindesbøll, Danish architect
 Johann Gottlieb Fichte, German philosopher
 Friedrich Gottlieb Klopstock, German poet
 Wolfgang Gottlieb Mozart, a variant of Mozart's name used by his father
 Christian Gottlieb Priber, American pioneer
 Friedrich Gottlieb Welcker, German philologist and archaeologist

See also 
 Gotlieb, surname
 Gottlob

References

German masculine given names
German-language surnames
Theophoric names